John H. Walton (born 1952) is an Old Testament scholar and Professor at Wheaton College.  He was a professor at Moody Bible Institute for 20 years. He specializes in the Ancient Near Eastern backgrounds of the Old Testament, especially Genesis and its creation account, as well as interpretation of Job.

At Wheaton College he is the primary professor for its M.A in Biblical Exegesis.

Views on origins
Walton espouses a view of Genesis creation narrative that resonates with ancient Near Eastern mindsets, much like a temple dedication ceremony, and not a strictly material account of cosmological origins. He uses a restaurant as an analogy, arguing that a restaurant does not begin to exist when the material building is completed, but when the owner declares the restaurant open for business. Through his book The Lost World of Genesis One he presents the Genesis creation as being functional rather than material.  This view is opposed by some theologians such as Vern Poythress and young earth creationist Ken Ham.

Publications

Books

Chapters

Journal articles

References

External links

See also

1952 births
American biblical scholars
American Christian theologians
American male non-fiction writers
Bible commentators
Living people
Old Testament scholars
Wheaton College (Illinois) alumni
Wheaton College (Illinois) faculty